Andy Briggs MBE (born March 1966) is a British businessperson and Chief Executive Officer of Phoenix Group. He previously served as the Aviva Chief Executive Officer UK Insurance and Global Life and Health as well as the Government Business Champion for Older Workers and NSPCC trustee.

Career 
Briggs started his career with Prudential as an actuarial trainee, staying with the firm for nineteen years and becoming CEO of the Prudential Group’s Retirement Income business UK and Europe.  After leaving Prudential, he worked at Scottish Widows, and Lloyds Banking Group before joining Friends Life as Group CEO
Aviva acquired Friends Life in April 2015 with Briggs becoming Chief Executive  of the UK and Ireland Life business.

In January 2017, it was announced that Aviva would merge its UK life and general insurance businesses.  As part of this, Briggs was announced as the new CEO UK Insurance. He stood down from this role in April 2019.

In November 2019, Phoenix Group announced that their current CEO Clive Bannister would be standing down, with Briggs was to be appointed as CEO subject to regulatory approval.  In February 2020, it was announced by Phoenix Group that Briggs had been appointed to the board of directors

Other interests 
Briggs became Chair of the Board of the Association of British Insurers in October 2016 for a two-year term.
At the Conservative Party conference on 4 October 2016 his appointment as Government Business Champion for Older Workers with Business in the Community was announced.  His role is to encourage other CEO’s and business leaders to recruit the over -50’s  as well as addressing issues such as balancing work and care provision.

In February 2017, he challenged UK businesses to increase the number of their workers aged 50-69 by 12% by 2022. Some of the UK’s largest companies, including Boots and the Co-Op  responded by pledging to act on Briggs’ challenge.  He also called on businesses to publish their data showing how many employees are over 50, with several including Barclays doing so in response.

He has also been a long-term supporter of the NSPCC, having joined the NSPCC Fundraising Committee in 2006 and is the current committee chair. In 2016 he became a trustee of the NSPCC.

Honours 
Briggs was awarded an MBE in the 2021 new year honours.

Professional qualifications and memberships 
He has a BSc Honours (1st) in Mathematics and Actuarial studies Southampton University.

References 

1966 births
Living people
British chief executives
Phoenix Group